Juma Mohamed Ahmed Ali Gharib Juma (born 16 April 1989) is an Emirati footballer, who currently plays for Al Ain FC and the UAE national team. He is best known for scoring at the 2009 FIFA U-20 World Cup in Egypt, giving the UAE a historic win against Venezuela on their way to the quarter-finals.

International goals
Scores and results list the UAE's goal tally first.

Honours

International 
United Arab Emirates
 Gulf Cup of Nations: 2013
 AFC Asian Cup third-place: 2015

Individual 
Awards

 Fans' Asian Champions League XI: 2016

References

External links
 
 
 
  Mohamed Ahmed news, photo, topics, and quotes at  daylife.com
 

1989 births
Living people
Emirati footballers
United Arab Emirates international footballers
2011 AFC Asian Cup players
2015 AFC Asian Cup players
2019 AFC Asian Cup players
Footballers at the 2012 Summer Olympics
Olympic footballers of the United Arab Emirates
Al Shabab Al Arabi Club Dubai players
Al Ain FC players
Sportspeople from Dubai
Association football defenders
Asian Games medalists in football
Footballers at the 2010 Asian Games
Asian Games silver medalists for the United Arab Emirates
UAE Pro League players
Medalists at the 2010 Asian Games